Charles Granger may refer to:

Charles Henry Granger (1812–1893), American itinerant painter
Charles T. Granger (1835–1915), American pioneer and judge
Charles Granger (1912–1995), Canadian politician